This is a list of the candidates who ran for the Evergreen Party of Alberta in the 28th Alberta provincial election. The party nominated candidates in 25 of the 87 electoral districts. The party also ran Elizabeth Johannson in the Senate nominee election.

Calgary area (11 of 28 seats)

Edmonton area (10 of 26 seats)

Remainder of province (4 of 33 seats)

See also
Alberta Greens candidates, 2004 Alberta provincial election
Alberta Electoral Boundary Re-distribution, 2010

References

Alberta Greens candidates in Alberta provincial elections
Candidates, 2012 Alberta provincial election
2012 Alberta general election